Striježevica may refer to:

Striježevica, Croatia, a village near Brestovac
Striježevica, Bosnia and Herzegovina, a village near Doboj, Republika Srpska